Shoaib Nasir (born 26 February 1983) is a Pakistani first-class cricketer who plays for Rawalpindi.

References

External links
 

1983 births
Living people
Pakistani cricketers
Rawalpindi cricketers
Water and Power Development Authority cricketers
Cricketers from Rawalpindi